Semonkong Airport  is an airport serving the village of Semonkong in Maseru District, Lesotho.

See also

Transport in Lesotho
List of airports in Lesotho

References

External links
OpenStreetMap - Semonkong
OurAirports - Semonkong
SkyVector - Semongkong

Airports in Lesotho